Whitechapel Computer Works Ltd. (WCW) was a computer workstation company founded in the East End of London, United Kingdom in April 1983 by Timothy Eccles and Bob Newman, with a combined investment of £1 million from the Greater London Enterprise Board (£100,000 initially), venture capital companies Newmarket and Baillie Gifford, and the Department of Trade and Industry. The company was situated in the Whitechapel Technology Centre - a council-funded high-technology enterprise hub - and began the design of their first workstation model in August 1983, shipping the first units by September 1984.

MG-1 Workstation 
The company's first workstation model was the MG-1 (named after the Milliard Gargantubrain from The Hitchhiker's Guide to the Galaxy). The MG-1 was based on the National Semiconductor NS32016 microprocessor, with 512 KB of RAM (expandable to 8 MB), a 1024 × 800 pixel monochrome display, a 10, 22 or 45 MB hard disk, 800 KB floppy drive, and an optional Ethernet interface, with prices stated as being equivalent to $6975 for the 10 MB hard disk system, $8250 for the 22 MB system and $9500 for the 45 MB system.

A contemporary evaluation of a 40 MB hard disk system with 2 MB RAM lists an approximate acquisition price of £9000. While there was no distributor in the United States, the MG-1 was sold in North America by Cybertool Systems Ltd. from 1984 through 1986. A colour version, the CG-1, was also announced in 1986, followed by the MG-200, with an NS32332 processor, in 1987.

The MG-1 employed an 8 MHz 32016 CPU with 32082 memory management unit (MMU) and 32081 floating-point unit (FPU), with the MMU being noted in a 1985 article as "suffering from bugs" and being situated on its own board providing hardware fixes. In order to deliver the machine at prices closer to personal computers than contemporary workstations (such as Sun, Apollo and Perq), design techniques from the personal computer industry were adopted, with a single eight-layer system board being used to hold the CPU and other integrated circuits.

Initially, NatSemi's Genix operating system, described as being based on Unix System III with 4.1BSD enhancements, or just 4.1BSD, was provided. NatSemi's Unix roadmap in 1984 advertised forthcoming 4.2BSD features and a "generic port of UNIX System V". However, during 1985, Genix was replaced on the MG-1 by a port of 4.2BSD called 42nix and augmented with the Oriel graphical user interface to give a reported factor of six performance improvement in graphics performance, Oriel being partially kernel-based.

In order to improve responsiveness and reduce the latency observed with contemporary Unix systems, the mouse position was tracked using a dedicated processor which also monitored the keyboard for events, and a form of hardware mouse pointer was used, with the pointer bitmap being stored in its own 64-pixel buffer as a kind of overlay, this being combined with the main display image to produce the final screen image. The machine also featured a "soft power switch" similar to that provided by the Apple Lisa (and also the slightly later Torch Triple X) which initiated "an orderly UNIX shutdown".

Realising that the price of the MG-1, at around £5,495, would need to be reflected in the physical appearance of the MG-1, Whitechapel engaged industrial designers Fether & Partners to produce a design for the different units of the system. The collaboration eventually settled on locating most of the electronics in a single "two-tier" box reminiscent of stacked hi-fi systems, with the monitor a separate unit that could be placed on top of the main unit or alongside. The main unit was also designed to be stood on its end.

History and legacy 

WCW went into receivership in 1986, but were soon revived as Whitechapel Workstations Ltd. The new company, described as "a briefly flowering UK-based UNIX workstation company that shipped the first MIPS desktop computers in 1987", initially announced the MG-300 based on the MIPS architecture with a performance rating of 8 to 10 million instructions per second as part of a strategy to pursue sales in the US market via original equipment manufacturers and value-added resellers, with the company's management having been reconstituted to include "one-half new and one-half old staff". The MG-300 model was subsequently launched as the Hitech-10, featuring the MIPS R2000 processor, this being followed by the Hitech-20 with a MIPS R3000 processor, subsequently known as the Mistral-20. These ran the UMIPS variant of UNIX, with either X11 or NeWS-based GUIs, and were aimed at computer animation applications.

Whitechapel had reportedly sold as many as 1,000 workstations from its first range, these having been "particularly successful" in the London financial industry, and was aiming to increase production levels by relocating manufacturing from the UK to West Germany. However, the company entered receivership in April 1988. Its assets related to the Hitech-10 were purchased in June 1988 by a consortium, Computer Hitech International, which adopted the corporate identity Mistral Computer Systems. Mistral subcontracted the design of its systems to Algorithmics Ltd., this being "essentially the rump of the old Whitechapel design team". Algorithmics was later acquired by MIPS Technologies in 2002.

References 

Defunct companies based in London
Defunct computer companies of the United Kingdom
Defunct computer hardware companies
Computer companies established in 1983
Computer workstations
MIPS architecture